Yesterday Once More is a 2-disc compilation album by US pop group The Carpenters. It was released in 1985 and has been certified platinum in both the US and UK.  The album was re-released in 1987 as Classics Volume 2 in the A&M 25th Anniversary Classics series. It was a simple repackage, reusing the 1985 glass CD masters, but with different artwork.  It was re-released in 1998 with the addition of an extra track, "I Just Fall in Love Again," a revised track order, and remastered in 24-bit sound with new notes by Paul Grein.

Track listing (1985)

Disc one
"Yesterday Once More" (Remix) (Richard Carpenter, John Bettis) – 3:58
"Superstar" (Remix) (Leon Russell, Bonnie Bramlett) – 3:45
"Rainy Days and Mondays" (Remix) (Paul Williams, Roger Nichols) – 3:38
"(Want You) Back in My Life Again" (Kerry Chater, Chris Christian) – 3:39
"Ticket to Ride" (1973 version) (Lennon–McCartney)– 4:07
"Goodbye to Love" (Remix) (Carpenter, Bettis) – 3:57
"Bless the Beasts and Children" (Remix) (Barry DeVorzon, Perry Botkin Jr.) – 3:16
"It's Going to Take Some Time" (Carole King, Toni Stern) – 2:55
"Calling Occupants of Interplanetary Craft" (Terry Draper, John Woloschuk) – 7:07
"Sweet, Sweet Smile" (Juice Newton, Otha Young) – 2:57
"I Won't Last a Day Without You" (Williams, Nichols) – 3:50
"For All We Know" (single) (Fred Karlin, Arthur James, Robb Wilson) – 2:29
"Touch Me When We're Dancing" (Terry Skinner, Kenny Bell, J.L. Wallace) – 3:23

Disc two
"There's a Kind of Hush" (Remix) (Les Reed, Geoff Stephens) – 3:04
"This Masquerade" (Russell) – 4:50
"Hurting Each Other" (Gary Geld, Peter Udell) – 2:46
"Please Mr. Postman" (Georgia Dobbins, William Garrett, Freddie Gorman, Brian Holland, Robert Bateman) – 2:52
"I Need to Be in Love" (Single edit, remix) (Carpenter, Bettis, Albert Hammond) – 3:29
"Make Believe It's Your First Time" (alternate) (Bob Morrison, Johnny Wilson) – 4:03
"All You Get from Love Is a Love Song" (Steve Eaton) – 3:46
"Top of the World" (Carpenter, Bettis) – 2:56
"Because We Are in Love (The Wedding Song)" (Carpenter, Bettis) – 5:00
"We've Only Just Begun" (remix) (Williams, Nichols) – 3:03
"Those Good Old Dreams" (Carpenter, Bettis) – 4:12
"Sing"  (Joe Raposo) – 3:17
"Only Yesterday" (edit) (Carpenter, Kōji Makaino, Bettis) – 3:50
"(They Long to Be) Close to You" (single) (Burt Bacharach, Hal David) – 3:43

Track listing (1998)

Disc one
"Yesterday Once More" (Carpenter, Bettis) – 3:58
"Superstar" (Russell, Bramlett) – 3:48
"Rainy Days and Mondays" (Williams, Nichols) – 3:40
"(Want You) Back in My Life Again" (Chater, Christian) – 3:39
"Ticket to Ride" (Lennon–McCartney) – 4:08
"Goodbye to Love" (Carpenter, Bettis) – 3:58
"Bless the Beasts and Children" (De Vorzon, Botkin) – 3:05
"It's Going to Take Some Time" (King, Stern) – 2:57
"There's a Kind of Hush (All Over the World)" (Reed, Stephens) – 3:03
"Sweet, Sweet Smile" (Newton, Young) – 3:02
"I Won't Last a Day Without You" (Williams, Nichols) – 3:54
"For All We Know" (Karlin, James, Wilson) – 2:31
"Touch Me When We're Dancing" (Skinner, Bell, Wallace) – 3:20
"Calling Occupants of Interplanetary Craft" (Draper, Woloschuk) – 7:09

Disc two
"I Just Fall in Love Again" (Steve Dorff, Larry Herbstritt, Gloria Sklerov, Harry Lloyd) – 4:03
"This Masquerade" (Russell) – 4:53
"Hurting Each Other" (Geld, Udell) – 2:46
"Please Mr. Postman" (Bateman, Dobbins, Garrett, Gorman, Holland) – 2:50
"I Need to Be in Love" (Carpenter, Bettis, Hammond) – 3:49
"Make Believe It's Your First Time" (Morrison, Wilson) – 4:07
"All You Get from Love Is a Love Song" (Eaton) – 3:46
"Top of the World" (Carpenter, Bettis) – 3:00
"Because We Are in Love (The Wedding Song)" (Carpenter, Bettis) – 5:01
"We've Only Just Begun" (Williams, Nichols) – 3:04
"Those Good Old Dreams" (Carpenter, Bettis) – 4:12
"Sing" (Raposo) – 3:18
"Only Yesterday" (Carpenter, Kōji Makaino, Bettis) – 4:10
"(They Long to Be) Close to You" (Bacharach, David) – 4:33

Chart positions

Certifications

References

The Carpenters compilation albums
1984 compilation albums